Khavaran-e Sharqi Rural District is in Khavaran District of Ray County, Tehran province, Iran. At the National Census of 2011, there were 40,402 inhabitants in 11,069 households at the following census of 2011. At the most recent census of 2016, the population of the rural district was 39,346 in 11,352 households. The largest of its four villages was Qiamdasht, with 36,446 people.

References 

Ray County, Iran

Rural Districts of Tehran Province

Populated places in Tehran Province

Populated places in Ray County, Iran

fa:دهستان خاوران شرقی